Grintovec is a small settlement west of Šmarje in the City Municipality of Koper in the Littoral region of Slovenia. Grintovec lies along Route 11 between Koper and Dragonja, near Srgaši.

References

External links
Grintovec on Geopedia

Populated places in the City Municipality of Koper